The Austin Aztex began their second season as a professional team by playing 4 preseason exhibition matches. The first two games were held as a home-home series against Major League Soccer's Houston Dynamo.  They also played away games against the Laredo Heat and FC Dallas.  Their lone home preseason game against Houston was their final match at Nelson Field.  The Aztex now play their home matches at House Park a stadium located in downtown Austin.

On April 28, Austin hosted the Haitian national team.  The match was part of a charity series of matches for the Haitians who played FC Dallas and Trinity University in San Antonio earlier in the month.  The 4,132 fans who attended the Austin match donated $11,500 to help with the Haiti earthquake recovery effort.  In total the series of matches raised over $22,000.  The Austin match ended in a 0–0 tie.

On May 19, Austin played the Tampa Bay Rowdies in front of 6,051 fans, their largest home crowd in franchise history.

On August 24, Austin defeated the Carolina Railhawks 3–2.  This victory gave the club their first playoff berth in team history.

Players

Current roster 
as of June 16, 2010

Staff 
  Adrian Heath – Head Coach
  Bobby Murphy – Assistant Coach
  David Winner – Goalkeeping Coach

Schedule and results

Exhibition matches

2010 U.S. Open Cup

Regular season

Road attendance numbers are italicized.  Non-Austin goals are italicized.

Playoffs
By beating the Carolina Railhawks on August 24, the Aztex clinched a playoff spot for the first time in the team history. Although Austin ended the regular season with the second best record in the US second division, they were seeded third overall.  They opened up their quarterfinal series on the road against the Montreal Impact on October 6, where they lost 2–0 in rainy conditions.  The Aztex return to Austin for the second leg of the series on October 9, and lost 2–3.  This gave Montreal the win in the series with an aggregate score of 5–2.

Each round is a two-game aggregate goal series. Home teams for the first game of each series listed at the bottom of the bracket.

Road attendance numbers are italicized. Non-Austin goals are italicized.

Stats
Full Season

Field Players

Goalkeepers

GP – games played,  Min – Minutes played,  G – Goals scored,  A – Assists,  S – Shots,  F – FoulsGAA – Goals Against Average, GA – Goals Against, W – Wins, L – Losses, T – Ties, CS – Clean Sheets

References

2010
American soccer clubs 2010 season
Aus
Austin Aztex